Boorowa is a farming village in the Hilltops Region in the south west slopes of New South Wales, Australia. 
The town is in Hilltops Council local government area.

History
Before the arrival of Europeans, the area was part of the lands occupied by the Wiradjuri Nation with the Gandangara Aboriginal Australians. It is believed that the name 'Burrowa', the original spelling, derives from the local Aboriginal language and refers to a native bird, the plains turkey Australian bustard.

The first European to travel through what is now Boorowa Shire was surveyor George Evans in 1815. Unofficial occupation of the district began in 1821 with Irishmen Rodger Corcoran and Ned Ryan, both former convicts who had received their 'ticket of leave' from the Governor. The first land grant in the general area was issued to Thomas Icely in 1829. A mill was operating on the future town site of Boorowa by 1837, along with an inn and several houses.

Governor Gipps proposed the creation of a village named 'Burrowa' in 1842, to be located 9 km north-east of the present site at Kings Plains which had been surveyed in 1828. However, that spot proved unsuitable and the village was established on its present site in 1843. The early years in the district saw lawlessness and mayhem as a result of long running boundary disputes, theft of livestock and arson, even murders; the cause being remoteness and lack of law and order. Bushrangers roamed the surrounding unsettled wild mountainous land, making raids into the town and stations of the district.

Squatters took up large tracts of land in the Boorowa area but the introduction of the Robertson Land Acts in 1861 resulted in a new land grab where large numbers of settlers, particularly 'ticket of leave' men, applied for a 'selection' of land with low cost land parcels available.

The district was given over to farming, although it received a push along when gold was found at Carcoar, Browns Creek and Kings Plains. Gold mines were established although copper and iron were also extracted. Samuel Marsden's copper mine operated until 1900.

The town's rugby league team competed for the Maher Cup during the 20th century.

Railway

Boorowa residents and the local member of parliament lobbied the Government to direct the new southern main line progressing towards Goulburn to pass through the town.  However the towns of Yass and Murrumburrah won the debate. The next best option was a branch line to the town and this lobbying lasted 40 years before the line was eventually constructed, opening for traffic on 10 October 1914.

The arrival of the railway in 1874 spurred development. Burrowa's name was then changed to "Boorowa". Boorowa replaced Carcoar as the major service centre to local farmlands. It became a municipality in 1888. By the turn of the century a butter factory and freezing works were major employers in the town. Passenger trains ceased in 1980 and the Boorowa railway line from Galong to Boorowa closed in 1987.

The post office was ordered to discontinue use of the name "Burrowa" in 1914, but the two spellings were used interchangeably throughout the area for many years and the town's newspaper stubbornly retained the old spelling on its masthead until January 1951.

Infrastructure

The main infrastructure achievements over the 180 years that connected Boorowa to the rest of the Colony included the first Post Office and mail service in 1835, the electric telegraph in 1866, voice telephone in 1906, electric street lighting in the 1920s by the towns own generator, later the town and consumers were connected to the Burrinjuck Hydro electricity system in 1938.

Environment

The town is located on the Boorowa River, a tributary of the Lachlan River. The Murrumbidgee River drains the southern portion of the Boorowa district. The soil in the area is rich volcanic soil washed down over millennia from an extinct volcano known as Mount Canemumbola.

Climate 
Boorowa experiences an oceanic climate (Köppen: Cfb, Trewartha: Cfbk), with warm summers and cool winters.

Notable people 
 Frederick Ashton (1866−1941)circus proprietor
 Eric Bryce  (1932−2007)music teacher and composer
 Marguerite Ludovia Dale (1883−1963)feminist and playwright
 Thomas Jenkins (born 2001)rugby league player
 Francis McGrath (1866-1947) jockey and racehorse-trainer
 James Morrison  (born 1962) — jazz musician
 John Quinn (1862−1937)sheepdog expert and veterinary surgeon
 Karen Webb  Commissioner of the New South Wales Police Force
 John Willcock (1879−1956)engine driver and 15th Premier of Western Australia

Events 
 Boorowa's agricultural show is held in March.
 October long weekend -  The "Running of the Sheep" down the main street of Boorowa during the Irish Woolfest.

Gallery

Footnotes

External links 

 Hilltops Council web site
 Visit Hilltops Region Tourist Information
 Boorowa Irish Woolfest

Southern Tablelands
Towns in New South Wales
Hilltops Council